The Mardyke, also referred as the Mardyke Sports Ground, is the main sports campus of University College Cork (UCC), located at the western end of the Mardyke area near Cork city centre. The grounds and fitness facilities used by sports team representing, the general student body, and members of the public. Outdoors, there are floodlit grass and all-weather pitches, used for soccer, rugby union, Gaelic games, and hockey. Kayakers train in the adjacent North channel of the River Lee. There is a tartan track for athletics, where the Cork City Sports are held annually. The most notable performance came in the hammer throw on 3 July 1984, when the world record was broken six times in one evening by  Yuriy Sedykh and Sergey Litvinov.

History
The College Athletics Grounds were formed from the western parts of Cork Park, the eastern remainder of which is now called Fitzgerald's Park. From the 1870s, sports were played at Cork Park; its being unenclosed hindered the charging of admission to spectators. Important Cork GAA matches were played there until Cork Athletic Grounds opened in 1904. Rugby matches were mostly played at Cork Park, or occasionally at the Mardyke cricket ground to its east, which was enclosed but available seldom and at a high charge. When Cork Park staged the 1902 Cork International Exhibition, its Western Pitch was enclosed. In 1904, two rugby clubs, Cork Constitution and Cork County, took a lease on the Western Pitch. Subsequent references to "the Mardyke" as a venue for sports other than cricket generally refer to the Western Pitch. The two clubs deposited a £200 bond to the IRFU to persuade it stage an international there in 1905, and spent £1,500 on upgrades including a grandstand. They could not service the debt, and UCC took over the lease in 1911 and acquired the grounds outright in 1912.

UCC rented the Western Pitch to rugby, soccer, hockey and hurling clubs in the city for a 15% cut of the gate receipts. The Gaelic Athletic Association (GAA)'s ban on rugby and soccer applied to all players but did not apply to pitches not owned by GAA clubs, although during the Irish revolutionary period there was occasional tension between UCC GAA and UCC RFC and UCC AFC over the shared facilities.

The Mardyke facilities were severely damaged when the River Lee burst its banks on 19 November 2009. The Mardyke Arena reopened on 15 February 2010 after repairs costing €4m.

Mardyke Arena
The Mardyke Arena, an indoor sports centre opened in 2001, contains a gymnasium, swimming pool and other facilities. It is the home court of UCC Demons, a basketball team affiliated with the College though not limited to students.

Association football
The Mardyke was formerly an important venue for association football in Cork city. It was the home ground for several League of Ireland clubs in Cork city, including Fordsons, Cork F.C., Cork City, Cork United, Cork Athletic and Cork Hibernians. A crowd of 18,000 watched a friendly match in 1939 between Ireland and Hungary, the first international arranged by the FAI to be played outside Dublin. It is still regularly used by University College Cork A.F.C., hosting the 2009 Collingwood Cup, the 2015 Crowley Cup and a 2015 League of Ireland Cup quarter-final against Dundalk.

Rugby
The Mardyke was the most important rugby ground in Cork from 1904 until Munster Rugby developed Musgrave Park in the 1950s. Munster matches against touring sides alternated between the Mardyke and Thomond Park in Limerick.

Notes

Sources

Citations

External links
 Official Mardyke Arena website
 UCC website - University sports - Mardyke Facilities  
 UCC website - University companies - Mardyke Leisure (UCC) Ltd

Sport at University College Cork
Athletics (track and field) venues in the Republic of Ireland
Gaelic games grounds in the Republic of Ireland
Rugby union stadiums in Ireland
Republic of Ireland national football team home stadiums
Association football venues in the Republic of Ireland
Association football venues in Cork (city)
Sports venues in Cork (city)
Cork United F.C. (1940–1948)
Cork F.C.
Cork City F.C. (1938–1940)
Cork GAA venues
Cork Hibernians F.C.
Basketball venues in Ireland
Sports venues completed in 1911
1904 establishments in Ireland